The shooting competitions at the 2013 Mediterranean Games in Mersin took place between 23 June and 28 June at the Erdemli Shooting Range.

Athletes competed in 13 events. Men's 25 metre rapid fire pistol was not held because too few nations applied.

Medal summary

Men's events

Women's events

References

Sports at the 2013 Mediterranean Games
2013
Mediterranean Games
Shooting competitions in Turkey
International shooting competitions hosted by Turkey